Schroon Lake is a lake located by Schroon Lake, New York. Fish species present in the lake are lake trout, landlocked salmon, largemouth bass, smallmouth bass, northern pike, yellow perch, chain pickerel, rock bass, sunfish, and brown bullhead. There are three access points on the lake. One is a state owned hard surface ramp off US-9, just north of the hamlet of Pottersville. The second is a state owned hand launch access at the Eagle Point Campground off US-9, 2 miles north of the hamlet of Pottersville. The third is a village owned public beach launch access off US-9, in the village of Schroon Lake.

References

Lakes of New York (state)
Lakes of Warren County, New York
Lakes of Essex County, New York